Sævar Þór Gíslason (born 26 December 1975) is a retired Icelandic football striker who played 7 matches for the Icelandic national team.

References

External links

Gislason, Saevar Thor
Gislason, Saevar Thor
Icelandic footballers
Selfoss men's football players
ÍR men's football players
Fylkir players
Gislason, Saevar Thor
Iceland international footballers